Patiška Reka is a village in the municipality of Sopište, North Macedonia.

Demographics
In the 19th century some Christian Albanian speaking villagers from Upper Reka migrated to Patiška Reka where they constituted the local Orthodox village population and remained Albanian speaking until World War Two, living among Muslim Albanians before relocating to Skopje thereafter.

As of the 2021 census, Patiška Reka had 231 residents with the following ethnic composition:
Albanians 191
Persons for whom data are taken from administrative sources 39
Turks 1

According to the 2002 census, the village had a total of 579 inhabitants. Ethnic groups in the village include:
Albanians 579

References

Villages in Sopište Municipality
Albanian communities in North Macedonia